Anchor Button (Spanish: Botón de ancla) is a 1961 Spanish musical comedy film directed by Miguel Lluch and starring Manuel Gil, Ramón Arcusa and Manuel de la Calva. It is a remake of the 1948 film of the same title about three naval academy cadets.

Cast
 Manuel Gil as Guardamarina Carlos Corbián  
 Ramón Arcusa as Guardamarina José Luis Salgado  
 Manuel de la Calva as Un guadamarina  
 María del Sol Arce as María Rosa  
 Vicente Haro as Enrique  
 Armonía Montez 
 Miguel Gila as Trinquete  
 Manuel Gas as Oficial  
 José María Caffarel as Segundo Comandante  
 Manuel de Melero 
 Luis Induni as Padre de María  
 Mari Ely 
 Juanita Espín as Visitante Academia de Marina  
 Berta Carbonell as Visitante Academia de Marina  
 Isabel Osca 
 Isabel Ruiz 
 Josep Peñalver

References

Bibliography 
 Bentley, Bernard. A Companion to Spanish Cinema. Boydell & Brewer, 2008.

External links 
 

1961 romantic comedy films
Spanish romantic comedy films
1961 films
1960s Spanish-language films
Films directed by Miguel Lluch
Remakes of Spanish films
1960s Spanish films